Coleophora kantarica is a moth of the family Coleophoridae.

References

kantarica
Moths described in 2003